The Phil Knight Invitational is a college basketball event held in Portland, Oregon to celebrate Nike co-founder Phil Knight. There have been three different events held, most recently in November 2022. The event has been held at the Moda Center and Veterans Memorial Coliseum in the Rose Quarter.

2017 event 
The 2017 version of the event, also known as the PK-80 Invitational, was a 16-team, two-bracket college basketball event held on November 23, 24, and 26, 2017.

All teams had a business relationship with Nike. Each of the Power Five conferences of FBS football had two teams participating—the ACC (Duke and North Carolina), the Big 12 (Oklahoma and Texas), the Big Ten (Michigan State and Ohio State), the Pac-12 (Oregon and Stanford) and the SEC (Arkansas and Florida). Two non-football conferences also had two teams involved—the Big East (Butler and DePaul) and the West Coast Conference (Gonzaga and Portland). The remaining participants were UConn from the American Athletic Conference and Portland State from the Big Sky Conference. Georgetown was originally announced as a participant in the tournament, but withdrew from the tournament in July. DePaul replaced them in the tournament.

The teams were divided into two separate brackets: the Victory and Motion Brackets. Teams from the same conference were placed in separate brackets to avoid non-league sanctioned matchups. The field included 10 of the previous 14 National Champions and three of the Final Four participants from the 2017 NCAA tournament (North Carolina, Gonzaga, and Oregon). The two eight-team brackets ran simultaneously in the Moda Center and Veterans Memorial Coliseum with the crowning of two champions. 

Michigan State won the Victory Bracket while Duke won the Motion Bracket. The tournament was called the best in-season tournament ever due to the quality of the teams participating.

Round robin sub-regional games were also played in Nashville, Tennessee on November 24 and 25. Furman, New Hampshire, Northeastern, and Utah State participated with the games held at the Nashville Municipal Auditorium.

Victory Bracket

Campus site games

Championship round

All-Tournament team

Motion Bracket

Campus site games

Championship round

All-Tournament team

Sub-regional games

Source

Source

2019 event 
On March 6, 2019, Nike and ESPN announced the event will return as a one-day, four-team invitational tournament to be held at the Moda Center.  The four teams that participated were: Memphis, Oklahoma, Oregon, and Oregon State. The event consisted of only two games with Oregon defeating Memphis and Oklahoma defeating Oregon State.

2019 bracket

2022 event 
On February 15, 2022, it was announced that the event would return in honor of Knight's 85th birthday. For the first time, the event included women's teams. There were two separate events for each gender: the Phil Knight Invitational and the Phil Knight Legacy tournaments. The events were held from November 24 through 27, 2022.  All events were played in a bracket-style format, with the men's teams playing three games apiece and the women's teams playing two games. The events took place at three Portland venues: the University of Portland's Chiles Center, the Moda Center, and Veterans Memorial Coliseum (VMC). For the first two rounds of the men's brackets, the top half of the bracket played during the afternoon sessions and the bottom half of the bracket during the evening sessions. The championship and consolation games for all brackets were played at the same locations, with the Invitational tournament in the afternoon session and the Legacy tournament in the evening session. The championship and consolation games for the women's brackets were played before the corresponding game for the men.

Phil Knight Invitational tournament

Men's bracket
Game recaps: 

* – Denotes overtime period

Women's bracket
Game recaps:

Phil Knight Legacy tournament

Men's bracket
Game recaps:

Women's bracket 
Game recaps:

References

External links
 PK80 official site

College men's basketball competitions in the United States
College basketball competitions
2017 in sports in Oregon
Basketball competitions in Portland, Oregon
2017–18 in American basketball
College sports tournaments in Oregon